The women's slalom at the 2003 Asian Winter Games was held on 5 February 2003 at Owani Onsen Ski Area, Japan.

Schedule
All times are Japan Standard Time (UTC+09:00)

Results
Legend
DNF — Did not finish

References

Results

External links
Schedule

Women slalom